South Downs may refer to:

 the South Downs, a geological feature in Sussex, and geographically related topics:
 Arundel and South Downs (UK Parliament constituency)
 South Downs National Park
 South Downs Way, a footpath
 South Downs College
 South Downs (play), a 2011 play by David Hare